The corniculate cartilages (cartilages of Santorini) are two small conical nodules consisting of elastic cartilage, which articulate with the summits of the arytenoid cartilages and serve to prolong them posteriorly and medially.

They are situated in the posterior parts of the aryepiglottic folds of mucous membrane, and are sometimes fused with the arytenoid cartilages.

Eponym
It is named by Giovanni Domenico Santorini. The word "Corniculate" has a Latin root "cornu". Cornu means horn like projections. The projections of Corniculate cartilage look like "horns" hence the name.

Additional images

References

External links
 

Human head and neck